Banipur is a village in Chanditala I community development block of Srirampore subdivision in Hooghly district in the Indian state of West Bengal.

Geography

Gram panchayat
Villages in Ainya gram panchayat are: Akuni, Aniya, Bandpur, Banipur, Bara Choughara, Dudhkanra, Ganeshpur, Goplapur, Jiara, Kalyanbati, Mukundapur, Sadpur and Shyamsundarpur.

Demographics
As per 2011 Census of India, Banipur had a total population of 840 of which 442 (53%) were males and 398 (47%) were females. Population below 6 years was 89. The total number of literates in Banipur was 633 (84.29% of the population over 6 years).

Transport
Bargachia railway station and Baruipara railway station are the nearest railway stations.

References 

Villages in Chanditala I CD Block